Gruma, S.A.B. de C.V., known as Gruma, is a Mexican multinational corn flour (masa) and tortilla manufacturing company headquartered in San Pedro, near Monterrey, Nuevo León, Mexico. It is the largest corn flour and tortilla manufacturer in the world. Its brand names include Mission Foods (Misión in Mexico), Maseca, and Guerrero.

Gruma reported revenues of US$3.8 billion for 2014. It operates more than 79 plants worldwide, mainly in Mexico, the United States, and Europe, and employs approximately 18,000 people. It is listed on the Mexican Stock Exchange since 1994, and it had a NYSE listing through ADRs from 1998 to September 2015. It is a constituent of the IPC, the main benchmark index of Mexican stocks.

History

The first industrial production facility of corn flour in the world was opened in 1949 under the name "Molinos Azteca, S.A. de C.V.", later shortened to "Grupo Maseca". Expansion quickly led to the government of Costa Rica inviting the company to invest in that country, in 1973. From then on, a long tradition of investments outside of Mexico was followed. In 1977, Grupo Maseca opened a subsidiary in California, pioneering in the production of tortilla in the United States. It would be in Texas, in 1982, where Maseca would open the first production facility of nixtamalized corn flour in that country.

By 1990, the company had subsidiaries in North America and Central America, including the United States, Honduras, and Costa Rica. It was in this year when the company made its initial public offering in the Mexican Stock Exchange as "GIMSA", or "Grupo Industrial Maseca".

Gruma consolidated itself as a holding company after acquiring 10% of Banorte in 1992. From then on, a history of expansions would open subsidiaries around the world, including one in Coventry, England in 2000, and another one in Shanghai, China in 2006, also recently in Ukraine in 2010.

Subsidiaries
Apart from its 10% interest in Banorte, Gruma operates as a holding company for a number of subsidiaries that produce, market, and distribute its various products around the world.

Mission Foods

One of the world's largest producers of flatbread, tortilla and corn flour products.

Gruma Corporation
Produces and commercializes corn flour and tortillas in the United States, Europe, and China. In the United States, Gruma Corporation is headquartered in Irving, Texas.

Gruma Corporation in China is based in Shanghai, and made it the first tortilla producer in that country. In Asia, the company also has distributors in Japan, South Korea, Singapore, Hong Kong, Thailand, Philippines, and Taiwan.

GIMSA
Short for "Grupo Industrial Maseca, S.A.", it is dedicated to the production, distribution, and marketing of corn flour in Mexico. GIMSA has the largest production capacity, with a market share of about 70%. GIMSA has production facilities in 15 states, including Nayarit, Sonora, Chihuahua, Veracruz, Baja California Sur, Sinaloa, Jalisco, Yucatan, Nuevo León, Baja California, Chiapas, Tamaulipas, Guanajuato, Michoacán, and the State of Mexico.

Molinera de México
It is the largest producer of wheat flour in Mexico, with a capacity of one million tons. Gruma entered this market through joint ventures with Archer-Daniels-Midland in 1996, and the further acquisition of other companies. Among its principal brands are "Selecta", "Reposada", "Sello de Oro", and "Diluvio".

Prodisa
Produces, markets, and distributes tortillas through Gruma's most recognizable brand, Misión.

Tecno Maíz
Designs, manufactures and markets machinery for the production of tortillas and other corn snacks. The machinery is sold under the brands "Tortec" and "Batitec".

Gruma Centroamerica
Gruma also markets tortillas under the brand "Torti Rica", and other snacks with the brands "Tosty" and "Luisiana".

Molinos Nacionales (Monaca) and Derivados de Maíz Seleccionados (DEMASECA)
These two companies operate Gruma's interests in Venezuela, which make the company the second largest producer of corn and wheat flour in that country.

References

External links
Gruma
Yahoo.com Company Profile

Monterrey metropolitan area
Companies listed on the Mexican Stock Exchange
Companies formerly listed on the New York Stock Exchange
Manufacturing companies of Mexico
Mexican brands
Multinational companies
Tortilla
Food and drink companies established in 1949
Mexican companies established in 1949